Royal Thai Navy Convention Center or Royal Thai Navy Convention Hall  is a convention center under Royal Thai Navy (RTN) in Wat Arun Sub-District, Bangkok Yai District, Bangkok, Thailand.

History & service

Royal Thai Navy Convention Center was built in 2002 in the area of Naval Military Police in the adjacent a historic building, Royal Thai Naval Institute for the APEC 2003 to hold a grand dinner for the participants and as a viewing facility for the Royal Barge Procession.

This convention center is ideally located on west bank of the Chao Phraya River. It is opposite the Grand Palace, Tha Tian and Nagaraphirom Park, the most desired tourist locations in Bangkok. It currently provides services for catering gala dinners, exhibitions, conferences, seminars, incentives, banquets, receptions, workshops, party of various companies and private parties of all kinds-large or small.

Transportation
BMTA bus: route 19, 57, 710
Chao Phraya Ferry: Tha Tian Pier (N8) to Wat Arun Pier (round trip)
Chao Phraya Express Boat:  Wat Arun Pier

Nearby places
Wat Arun (Temple of Dawn) 
Taweethapisek School
Wat Khruea Wan Worawihan
Panichayakarnrajdamnern Technological College
Phra Racha Wang Derm (Thonburi Palace) 
Royal Thai Navy Headquarters

References

External links

Convention centers in Thailand
Royal Thai Navy
Bangkok Yai district
Buildings and structures in Bangkok
Buildings and structures on the Chao Phraya River
Buildings and structures completed in 2003
2002 establishments in Thailand